Pterygota is a genus of flowering plants in the family Malvaceae.

In older systems of classification, it was placed in Sterculiaceae, but all members of that family are now in an expanded Malvaceae.

Pterygota has a pantropical distribution.

Species
Species of the genus Pterygota include:
Pterygota alata (Buddha coconut)
Pterygota bequaertii
Pterygota macrocarpa

See also

Sterculioideae
Malvaceae genera